Rodgers Kola (born 4 July 1989) is a Zambian footballer who plays for Zanaco. He is a versatile forward who is usually deployed on the wing.

Club career
Kola was born in Lusaka.  He signed for Russia's PFC Spartak Nalchik in July 2008 but could not link up with his teammates in Russia due to visa problems. Because of this, he returned to Zanaco in Zambia.

Kola successfully scored 2 goals at the 2007 FIFA U-20 World Cup and caught the eye of many European Clubs. He also scored 2 goals in a practice match against Zambia National U-20 Football team and another 2 against a German side in another practice match.

In 2009, he moved to Israel to play in Hapoel Bnei Lod who plays in the second division in Israel, a year later he moved to Hapoel Ironi Rishon LeZion from the same division.

In 2011, he started playing for the Israeli team F.C. Ashdod. Over there, he scored 7 goals in 31 games.

On 8 May 2012, it was announced that Kola would start playing in Belgium for the team K.A.A. Gent.

In January 2014, Kola returned to Israel and signed with Hapoel Ironi Kiryat Shmona. On January 28, he scored his first goal for the club against Hapoel Ironi Acre in the 8th round of the Israel State Cup. Kola scored against Beitar Jerusalem in the quarter finals match and in the semi-final match versus Hapoel Be'er Sheva and eventually won the Israeli State Cup. This was the first Israeli State Cup title Hapoel Kiryat Shmona ever won.

On 25 July 2015, Kola, was loaned to the Greek club Veria, for one year. Kola made his debut on 12 September 2015 in a 0–3 home defeat against PAOK where he had a few chances to score with headers though Robin Olsen stopped him twice.

International career
He already played 13 games in the team of the African Cup of Nations 2012-winner Zambia, in which he scored 2 times.

International goals
Scores and results list Zambia's goal tally first.

Honours
 Hapoel Ironi Kiryat Shmona
 Israel State Cup: 2014

References

External links

1989 births
Living people
Zambian footballers
Zambian expatriate footballers
Zambia international footballers
Liga Leumit players
Israeli Premier League players
Super League Greece players
Sportspeople from Lusaka
Association football forwards
Expatriate soccer players in South Africa
Zambian expatriate sportspeople in South Africa
Expatriate footballers in Israel
Zambian expatriate sportspeople in Israel
Zanaco F.C. players
Lamontville Golden Arrows F.C. players
Hapoel Bnei Lod F.C. players
Hapoel Rishon LeZion F.C. players
F.C. Ashdod players
K.A.A. Gent players
Hapoel Ironi Kiryat Shmona F.C. players
Veria F.C. players
Hapoel Ra'anana A.F.C. players